McCartney III Imagined is a remix album of songs from McCartney III, the 18th solo album by English musician Paul McCartney. It was released digitally on 16 April 2021, with a physical version released on 23 July. It features remixes by numerous artists.

The tracks were curated by McCartney, featuring "friends, fans, and brand new acquaintances". Dominic Fike's version of "The Kiss of Venus" was released as the first single, followed by Beck's version of "Find My Way" and EOB's version of "Slidin'".

Coinciding with its release, McCartney had live conversations via Instagram Live with several contributors. The album received positive reviews. Following McCartney III accomplishing the same feat, it became the first remix album to top Billboards Top Album Sales Chart in more than a decade, also becoming number 1 on the Rock Albums and Vinyl Albums charts.

Background
For McCartney III Imagined, McCartney enlisted numerous collaborators to remix and perform songs from the album, including: Beck, Dominic Fike, Khruangbin, St. Vincent, Dev Hynes, Phoebe Bridgers, Ed O'Brien, Damon Albarn, Josh Homme, Anderson .Paak, Robert Del Naja, and Idris Elba.

Critical reception

At Metacritic, which assigns a normalized rating out of 100 to reviews from professional publications, McCartney III Imagined has an average score of 76, based on 11 reviews, indicating "generally favorable reviews". Aggregator AnyDecentMusic? gave the album 7 out of 10, based on its assessment of the critical consensus.

Track listing
All tracks are written by Paul McCartney.

Charts

References

2021 remix albums
Paul McCartney albums
Capitol Records remix albums
Remix albums by English artists